The Rallye du Var is a motor rally held in the month of November in the French commune of Sainte-Maxime in Var. It is often held as the final round of the French Rally Championship. It began in 1950.

Famous participants include WRC champion, Sébastien Loeb (the 2000, 2009 and 2014 winner), the four-time Formula One champion Alain Prost, 1994 WRC champion Didier Auriol (the 1987 and 1988 winner), Freddy Loix, Craig Breen, Jari-Matti Latvala (the 2011 winner), Dany Snobeck (the 1982 and 2008 winner), 2010 24 Hours of Le Mans winner Romain Dumas, François Chatriot (the 1985, 1986 and 1989 winner), Renault F1 driver and 2008 Canadian Grand Prix winner Robert Kubica, and Julien Maurin (the 2013 winner). Jari-Matti Latvala was the first non-Frenchman and thus foreign driver to win the rally, and it was also his first win on asphalt.

As well as part of the French Rally Championship, the Rallye du Var was part of the European Rally Championship calendar from 1984 to 2001.

Recent years

2008
Dany Snobeck, who had last won the Rallye du Var 26 years before, took his second victory in the event and beat out much younger drivers, such as the 25-year-old, Jean-Sébastien Vigion who finished second. The World Rally Champion, Sébastien Loeb, returned for this event and was third. Both of Snobeck's previous challengers, Eric Brunson and Pieter Tsjoen had retired so Snobeck was sure to win from the get-go.

2009
Sébastien Loeb who recently won the 2009 World Rally Championship won here again in the title-winning Citroën C4 WRC, but this time co-driven by his wife, Séverine Loeb, for his regular co-driver Daniel Elena was driving a separate entry. The podium finishers were Stéphane Sarrazin and Patrick Henry. The Belgian Pieter Tsjoen, who crashed out of last year's rally, led for one stage in his Ford Focus RS WRC.

2016
In 2016, the 62nd running of this event, Hyundai WRC driver Kevin Abbring and co-driver Sebastian Marshall in a Hyundai i20 WRC won this event, and was the second driver who is not French to win Rallye du Var, after Latvala's victory in 2011. Second place went to Yoann Bonato. In third was Sylvain Michel. David Salanon, the winner of last year's rally, suffered bad luck when he had an accident on special stage 10, Pignans, whilst leading, and this allowed Dutchman Abbring to win.

2017
In 2017, Frenchman David Salanon won the event for the second time, this time partnered with Jérôme Degout, with Sylvain Michel and Yohan Rossel completing the podium. Sébastien Loeb returned to the event, driving his recently refurbished Formula 2 Peugeot 306 Maxi. Despite his car being 20 years older than those of his rivals, Loeb led for most of the event, eventually dropping behind Salanon to second, before retiring on the penultimate stage with an engine issue.

2018
In 2018, Yoann Bonato won this event for the first time. Sylvain Michel led early on but suffered an accident in special stage 3 which ended his challenge.

Winners

2018: Yoann Bonato
2017: David Salanon
2016: Kevin Abbring
2015: David Salanon
2014: Sébastien Loeb
2013: Julien Maurin
2012: Cédric Robert
2011: Jari-Matti Latvala
2010: Cédric Robert
2009: Sébastien Loeb
2008: Dany Snobeck
2007: Jean-Marie Cuoq
2006: Nicolas Vouilloz
2005: Nicolas Bernardi
2004: Alexandre Bengué
2003: Simon Jean-Joseph
2002: Cédric Robert
2001: Stéphane Sarrazin
2000: Sébastien Loeb
1999: Philippe Bugalski
1998: Philippe Bugalski
1997: François Delecour
1996: cancelled
1995: Patrick Bernardini
1994: Sylvain Polo
1993: Pierre-César Baroni
1992: Jean Ragnotti
1991: Bernard Béguin
1990: Bruno Saby
1989: François Chatriot
1988: Didier Auriol
1987: Didier Auriol
1986: François Chatriot
1985: François Chatriot
1984: Jean-Claude Andruet
1983: Guy Fréquelin
1982: Dany Snobeck
1981: Dominique De Meyer
1980: Jean-Claude Andruet
1979: Francis Bondil

Famous drivers

 Kevin Abbring
 Jean-Claude Andruet
 Mathieu Arzeno
 Didier Auriol
 Bryan Bouffier
 Alexandre Bengué
 Luca Betti
 Craig Breen
 Philippe Bugalski
 Olivier Burri
 Pierre Campana
 Yann Clairay
 Keith Cronin
 Jean-Marie Cuoq
 François Delecour
 Bernard Darniche
 Romain Dumas
 Guy Fréquelin
 Matteo Gamba
 Hermann Gassner, Jr.
 Quentin Gilbert
 Jonathan Hirschi
 Thomas Holzer
 Chris Ingram
 Andrzej Koper
 Robert Kubica
 Jari-Matti Latvala
 Stéphane Lefebvre
 Freddy Loix
 Sébastien Loeb
 Julien Maurin
 Jimmy McRae
 Jarkko Nikara
 Sébastien Ogier
 Alain Oreille
 Gilles Panizzi
 Alain Prost
 Conrad Rautenbach
 Bruno Saby
 David Salanon
 Stéphane Sarrazin
 Todor Slavov
 Ekaterina Stratieva
 Ott Tänak
 Brice Tirabassi
 Max Vatanen
 Albert von Thurn und Taxis
 Nicolas Vouilloz
 Antony Warmbold
 Jon Woodner

References

External links
 Rallye du Var website

Var
Var
Sport in Var (department)